Thomas Gomart is a French historian of international relations (History – Paris I Panthéon-Sorbonne) and the director of IFRI (Institut français des relations internationales) since 2015. He was previously vice-president for strategic development at IFRI, and director of the Russia/NIS Center and of the trilingual electronic collection Russie.NEI.Visions in English.

A Lavoisier Fellow at the State Institute for International Relations (University-MGIMO – Moscow), visiting fellow at the European Union Institute for Security Studies (Paris) and Marie Curie Fellow at Department of War Studies (King’s College – London), Gomart writes on Russia and the post-Soviet area, especially the Russia-EU-USA relations and Russian civil-military relations. He is currently studying the concept of cyberpower.

Gomart is teaching at the French Military School of Saint-Cyr (use of military power in international relations and geopolitics of energy). He regularly contributes articles to the French and the international media.

Publications 

 Editor

 Russian Energy Security and Foreign Policy, London, Routledge, 2011, 253 p (with A. Dellecker)
 Russie.Nei.Visions 2009, Understanding Russia and New Independent States, Paris, Ifri-Documentation française, 2009, 248 p (with T. Kastueva-Jean)
 Russie.Nei.Visions 2008, Understanding Russia and New Independent States, Paris, Ifri-Documentation française, 2008, 180 p (avec T. Kastueva-Jean)
 “Russie: Enjeux intérieurs et internationaux”, Politique étrangère, n° spécial, 2007, 245 p.
 Russie.Nei.Visions 2007, Understanding Russia and New Independent States, Paris, Ifri-Documentation française, 2007, 180 p (avec T. Kastueva-Jean)
 Russie.Nei.Visions 2006, Understanding Russia and New Independent States, Paris, Ifri-Documentation française, 2006, 180 p (avec T. Kastueva-Jean)

 Books

 Russian Civil-Military Relations: Putin’s Legacy, Washington DC, Carnegie Endowment for International Peace, 2008, 128 p, foreword by D. Trenin
 Double détente, Les relations franco-soviétiques de 1958 à 1964, Paris, Publications de la Sorbonne, 2003, 494 p, foreword by R. Frank (Institut de France, Prix Jean-Baptiste Duroselle, 2003)
 Les Rapports russo-français vus de Moscou, Paris, Les notes de l’Ifri, n° 41, 2002, 84 p, foreword by D. David
 Un lycée dans la Tourmente, (directed by J-P. Levert, with A. Merville), Paris, Calmann-Lévy, 1994, 267 p, foreword by R. Rémond

 Chapters
 « La diplomatie culturelle française à l’égard de l’URSS : objectifs, moyens et obstacles (1956-1966)», in J-F. Sirinelli et G-H. Soutou, Culture et Guerre froide, Paris, PUPS, 2008, p. 173-188
 « Les services de renseignement français face à la menace soviétique au début des années soixante (1958-1964) », in B. Warusfel, Le Renseignement, Guerre, technique et politique (XIXe-XXe siècles), Paris, Lavauzelle-CEHD, 2007, p. 203-220
 « Le dispositif du PCF dans les relations franco-soviétiques (1958-1964) », in M. Vaïsse, De Gaulle et la Russie, Paris, Cnrs éditions, 2006, p. 125-138
 « Russie : trop-plein d’énergies ou d’inerties », in T. de Montbrial et P. Moreau Defarges, Ramses 2006, Paris, Dunod, 2005, p. 79-94
 « Russie, Retour vers 2008 », in T. de Montbrial and P. Moreau Defarges, Ramses 2005, Paris, Dunod, 2004, p. 300-302
 « Russie, Vladimir Poutine aux commandes », in T. de Montbrial and P. Moreau Defarges, Ramses 2004, Paris, Dunod, 2003, p. 328-330
 « Les dilemmes de la coopération : prévention des conflits, gestion des crises et règlement des conflits », in D. Lynch, EU-Russian Security Dimensions, Paris, IES, Occasional Papers, n° 46, July 2003, p. 20-41

 Articles (since 2003)

 « Politique étrangère française : déni ou dénigrement ? », Revue des deux mondes, October 2014.
 « Think tanks à la française », with Thierry de Montbrial, Le Débat, September–October 2014.
 « Crimée : retour du passé et fuite en avant », Revue des deux mondes, June 2014.
 « Ukraine-Russie : vers une nouvelle guerre ? Entretien avec Pierre Hassner », Revue des deux mondes, June 2014.
 « Diplomates et réseaux sociaux : entretien avec Carl Bildt », Revue des deux mondes, March 2014. 
 « De quoi Snowden est-il le nom ? », Revue des deux mondes, December 2013.
 « Pour une histoire des relations internationales ou vers une histoire globale », Revue des deux mondes, February 2013, pp. 59–65, interview with Robert Frank.
 « De la diplomatie numérique », Revue des deux mondes, January 2013, pp. 131–141.
 « Russie: un positionnement international en voie de redéfinition », Questions internationales, n° 57, September–October 2012, pp. 47–54.
 « La France, charnière centrale de l'Europe », Revue des deux mondes, April 2012, pp. 66–78 (avec Etienne de Durand).
 « Vladimir Poutine: Mâle dominant de toutes les Russies? », Revue des deux mondes, January 2012, pp. 51–58.
 « Ecrire l'histoire des relations internationales après WikiLeaks », Revue des deux mondes, May 2011, pp. 83–94.
 « Russian Civil-Military Relations: Is There Something New with Medvedev? », in S. Blank (ed.), Civil-Military Relations in Medvedev’s Russia, Strategic Studies Institute, US Army War College, January 2011, pp. 77–102.
 « Dva orientira dliâ Rossii », Russia in Global Affairs, December 2010.
 « Fragile colosse du monde multipolaire », Revue des deux mondes, October–November 2010, pp. 76–84.
 «Europe in Russian Foreign Policy: Important but no longer Pivotal », Russie.Nei.Visions, No. 50, May 2010.
 «OTAN-Russie : la "question russe" est-elle européenne ? », Politique étrangère, No. 4, 2009.
 « Washington-Moscou : la nouvelle donne », Politique internationale, No. 123, 2009, pp. 247–264
 « Obama and Russia : Facing the Heritage of the Bush Years », Russie.Nei.Visions, n° 39, April 2009, 22 p
 « Rossiâ odna navsegda? », Russia in Global Affairs, No. 5, 2008, pp. 140–150
 « Russia Alone Forever? The Kremlin’s Strategic Solitude », Politique étrangère, special issue “World Policy Conference”, 2008, pp. 23–33
 « EU-Russia Relations: Toward a Way Out of Depression », in A. Kuchins and T. Gomart, Europe, Russia, and the US: Finding A New Balance, Washington, Ifri/Csis, Transatlantic Project, July 2008, 23 p
 « L’Europe marginalisée », Politique internationale, No. 118, 2008, pp. 209–221
 « Evropa, Rossiâ i SSA: novye velitchiny starovo uravneniâ », Russia in Global Affairs, No. 1, 2008, pp. 154–166
 « Paris and the EU-Russia dialogue : A New Impulse with Nicolas Sarkozy? », Russie.Nei.Visions, No. 23, October 2007, 24 p.
 « Union européenne/Russie : de la stagnation à la dépression », Revue du marché commun et de l’Union européenne, No. 510, 2007, pp. 423–429
 « Quelle place pour la Russie en Europe ? », Questions internationales, No. 27, 2007, pp. 42–48
 « France’s Russia Policy: Balancing Interests and Values », The Washington Quarterly, No. 2, 2007, pp. 147–155
 « Rossijskij vector politiki Parija: preodolet’ status-kvo », Vestnik Analitiki, No. 1, 2007, pp. 53-66
 « La politique russe de la France : fin de cycle ? » , Politique étrangère, No. 1, 2007, pp. 123-135
 « The EU and Russia: The Needed Balance Between Geopolitics and Regionalism », Russie.Nei.Visions, No. 10(b), May 2006, 24 p
 « Quelle influence russe dans l’espace post-soviétique ? » , Le courrier des pays de l’Est, No. 1055, 2006, pp. 4-13
 « Paradoks nepostoânstva », Russia in Global Affairs, No. 3, 2006, pp. 62-72
 « Politique étrangère russe : l’étrange inconstance », Politique étrangère, No. 1, 2006, pp. 25-36. « Russian Foreign Policy: Strange Inconsistency », UK MoD, CSRC, 06/12 (E), March 2006
 « L’Union européenne et la mer Noire : franchir un nouveau cap avec les moyens du bord », The Role of the Wider Black Sea Area in a Future European Security Space, Nato Defense College, Occasional Paper, No. 11, December 2005, pp. 13-22
 « Les quatre espaces : concept d’hier, d’aujourd’hui ou de demain », Evropa , No. 5, 2005
 « Putin’s Russia : Towards A New Combination Of Military And Foreign Policies », World Defence Systems, No. 2, 2004, pp. 42-44
 « Différer pour mieux attendre, La stratégie de l’Union européenne à l’égard de la Russie (1997-2003) », Matériaux pour l’histoire de notre temps, No. 76, 2004, pp. 48-53
 « Les trois enjeux du partenariat entre l’Union européenne et la Russie » , Politique étrangère, No. 2, 2004, pp. 387-399
 « Le partenariat entre l’Union européenne et la Russie à l’épreuve de l’élargissement », Revue du Marché commun et de l’Union européenne, No. 479, 2004, pp. 349-354. « Enlargement Tests the Partnership Between the EU and Russia », UK MoD, CSRC, 04/23, August 2004
 « Gêner sans pénaliser, L’utilisation du dossier algérien par la diplomatie soviétique, 1958-1962 », Communisme, n° 74/75, 2003, p. 131-152
 « Vladimir Poutine ou les avatars de la politique étrangère russe », Politique étrangère, No. 3-4, 2003, pp. 789–802
 « Le PCF au miroir des relations franco-soviétiques (1964-1968) », Relations internationales, No. 114, 2003, pp. 249–266

See also

Articles linked 
 Russie.NEI.Visions in English
 Foreign relations of Russia
 Energy policy of Russia

References

External links
 IFRI's website
 Electronic collection Russie.Nei.Visions

International relations scholars
University of Paris alumni
Living people
Foreign policy and strategy think tanks
Year of birth missing (living people)